Schüssel Cirque is a large west-facing cirque containing Schüssel Moraine, in the north-central part of the Humboldt Mountains of Queen Maud Land. It was discovered by the German Antarctic Expedition under Alfred Ritscher, 1938–39, who referred to it as "In der Schüssel" (in the bowl) and "Grosse Brei-Schüssel" (great mash bowl). The Advisory Committee on Antarctic Names has recommended a shorter form of the original names and has added the appropriate generic term.

References 
 Schussel Cirque, Australian Antarctic Data Centre
 Aerial photograph from the German expedition 1939, view towards SSE

Cirques of Queen Maud Land
Humboldt Mountains (Antarctica)